The 2019 High Peak Borough Council election took place on 2 May 2019 to elect all 43 members of High Peak Borough Council in Derbyshire, England.

The election resulted in the Labour Party taking control of the council from the Conservative Party after winning 22 of the 43 seats up for election. The Conservatives lost 7 of the seats they were defending and lost their majority on the council. The Liberal Democrats and Greens won 3 and 2 seats respectively.

Summary
After the election, the composition of the council was:
Labour 22
Conservative 16
Liberal Democrat 3
Green 2

Election result

|-

Ward results

By-elections

Cote Heath

References

2019
2019 English local elections
2010s in Derbyshire
May 2019 events in the United Kingdom